Knefastia kugleri is an extinct species of sea snail, a marine gastropod mollusc in the family Pseudomelatomidae, the turrids and allies.

Description
The length of the shell attains 52 mm.

Distribution
This extinct marine species was found in upper middle Miocene strata in  the Paraguana Peninsula, Venezuela.

References

 P. Jung. 1965. Miocene Mollusca from the Paraguana Peninsula, Venezuela. Bulletins of American Paleontology 49(223):389-652

kugleri
Gastropods described in 1965
Miocene gastropods